In geometry, the truncated dodecahedron is an Archimedean solid. It has 12 regular decagonal faces, 20 regular triangular faces, 60 vertices and 90 edges.

Geometric relations
This polyhedron can be formed from a regular dodecahedron by truncating (cutting off) the corners so the pentagon faces become decagons and the corners become triangles.

It is used in the cell-transitive hyperbolic space-filling tessellation, the bitruncated icosahedral honeycomb.

Area and volume
The area A and the volume V of a truncated dodecahedron of edge length a are:

Cartesian coordinates
Cartesian coordinates for the vertices of a truncated dodecahedron with edge length 2φ − 2, centered at the origin, are all even permutations of:
(0, ±, ±(2 + φ))
(±, ±φ, ±2φ)
(±φ, ±2, ±(φ + 1))

where φ =  is the golden ratio.

Orthogonal projections
The truncated dodecahedron has five special orthogonal projections, centered: on a vertex, on two types of edges, and two types of faces. The last two correspond to the A2 and H2 Coxeter planes.

Spherical tilings and Schlegel diagrams
The truncated dodecahedron can also be represented as a spherical tiling, and projected onto the plane via a stereographic projection. This projection is conformal, preserving angles but not areas or lengths. Straight lines on the sphere are projected as circular arcs on the plane.

Schlegel diagrams are similar, with a perspective projection and straight edges.

Vertex arrangement
It shares its vertex arrangement with three nonconvex uniform polyhedra:

Related polyhedra and tilings 

It is part of a truncation process between a dodecahedron and icosahedron:

This polyhedron is topologically related as a part of sequence of uniform truncated polyhedra with vertex configurations (3.2n.2n), and [n,3] Coxeter group symmetry.

Truncated dodecahedral graph 

In the mathematical field of graph theory, a truncated dodecahedral graph is the graph of vertices and edges of the truncated dodecahedron, one of the Archimedean solids. It has 60 vertices and 90 edges, and is a cubic Archimedean graph.

Notes

References
 (Section 3-9)

External links

Editable printable net of a truncated dodecahedron with interactive 3D view
The Uniform Polyhedra
Virtual Reality Polyhedra The Encyclopedia of Polyhedra

Uniform polyhedra
Archimedean solids
Truncated tilings